Gianantonio is an Italian masculine blended given name that is a combination of Gianni and Antonio. Notable people known by this name include the following:

Gianantonio Capizucchi (1515 – 1569), Italian Roman Catholic cardinal and bishop
Gianantonio Da Re (born 1953), Italian politician
Gianantonio Davia (1660 – 1740), Italian Roman Catholic cardinal
Gianantonio Guardi, nickname of Giovanni Antonio Guardi (1699 – 1760), Italian painter and nobleman
Gianantonio Serbelloni, nickname of Giovanni Antonio Serbelloni (1519–1591), Italian Cardinal
Gianantonio Zopegni (1915 – 2003), Italian ice hockey player

See also

Gian Antonio
Giannantonio

Notes

Italian masculine given names